Bombs Away is the debut studio album by Australian indie pop band Sheppard. It was released on 11 July 2014 by Empire of Song. The album includes the singles "Geronimo", "Something's Missing", "Smile", "Let Me Down Easy" and "A Grade Playa". Bombs Away was released outside Australia through Decca Records in 2015. The album debuted at number two on the ARIA Albums Chart and was certified gold by the Australian Recording Industry Association for shipments exceeding 35,000 copies.

All the songs on the album were written by Sheppard members George Sheppard, Amy Sheppard and Jay Bovino. The album was produced, mixed and mastered by Stuart Stuart at Analog Heart Studios, Brisbane. Its lead single, "Geronimo", was the first number one single in Australia to be recorded in Brisbane.

Reviews
Bombs Away received generally positive reviews. Toby Creswell from Rolling Stone Australia gave the album four stars and said "These are sturdy pieces that could have been made any time since the Brill Building opened its doors." Arne Sjostedt from The Sydney Morning Herald gave the album three and a half stars out of five, saying, "Bombs Away is an innocent, rhythmic, light fuelled album that keeps you in its grasp for the majority of its 41 minutes. Songs that take aspects of modern/'90s pop, indie and a dash of nu-folk and blend it with something very much their own." Scott Fitzsimons from The Music gave the album three of out five saying, "The record's production is as polished as their press shots, but this is indie-pop that's fresh and not at all contrived" but added "At times, Bombs Away does fall into the pop trap of trying to tick too many boxes though".

Alex Parker of Vulture magazine said; "Because Sheppard's sound is so mixed and the album is filled with laid back tracks, upbeat ones... and ones that just make you wanna shout, Bombs Away is sure to appeal to anyone and everyone. It has the promise to be full of hits which is something you don't see much of these days and it's just a plain old good album." Bree Cohen of The AU Review gave the album 9 out of 10, saying; "Each track is memorable, and has that undeniable pizzazz that is oh so evident in 'Geronimo'. Sheppard are certainly no one trick pony, but they definitely know where their strengths lie and this definitely plays to their favour on Bombs Away. A killer record."

Tour
After supporting Keith Urban throughout June on the Australian leg of his Light the Fuse Tour, Sheppard announced their Bombs Away album launch tour on 22 June. Eight additional dates throughout Australia in October were announced on 4 September.

Track listing
Band member Amy discussed the tracks on Bombs Away; "I've noticed most of the new tracks are about the restorative journey after being pushed down. Everyone has had their rough moments and we hope our music can help some people through those hard times."

Charts

Weekly charts

Year-end charts

Certifications

Awards and nominations

Release history

References

2014 debut albums
ARIA Award-winning albums
Sheppard (band) albums